Costel is a Romanian male given name, a diminutive of Constantin (other Romanian diminutives of Constantin are Costin, Costi, Costinel, Costică, Titi). It is also a Spanish given name. Costel may refer to:

Costel Busuioc
Costel Câmpeanu
Costel Danculea
Costel Grasu
Costel Mozacu
Costel Pantilimon
Costel Rădulescu

Romanian masculine given names